Daina House (born December 30, 1954 in Dallas, Texas) is a former model and actress. She was Playboy magazine's Playmate of the Month for its January 1976 issue. Her centerfold was photographed by Ken Marcus.

House, sometimes credited as "Dana" House, appeared in the short TV comedy film Off the Wall in 1977, and has had numerous smaller roles in other shows.

She is now a ministry leader at the Church on the Way in Van Nuys, California.

References

External links
 
 
 

1954 births
Living people
1970s Playboy Playmates